The Oran Park V8 Supercar round was a V8 Supercar, and formerly Australian Touring Car Championship, motor racing event held at Oran Park Raceway in Narellan, New South Wales, Australia. The event was held in every year from 1971 to 2008, with only three circuits having hosted more events in championship history as of 2020.

History

The Oran Park round of the championship was often held as the final round of the Australian Touring Car Championship and as such decided several championship titles. The first of these was in the inaugural event in 1971, with Bob Jane, Ian Geoghegan and Allan Moffat all entering the round with a chance of winning the championship. Moffat had led the race early before hitting problems, eventually closing down Jane in the final laps but unable to overtake. The race was also infamous for a spectator driving their Chrysler Valiant onto the circuit during the race, and in 2016 was considered as one of the top five races in championship history. In 1972, Moffat won the last championship round for the Ford Mustang nameplate until 2019. In the 1970s, two events were split into two races based on engine capacities. In these smaller capacity races, Ray Gulson in 1974 and Lawrie Nelson in 1979 won their only career championship races.
The 1980 race was held on the Queen's Birthday public holiday Monday, having been postponed from the Sunday due to heavy rain. Bob Morris won the 1984 event, despite not only having not competed in any other championship round that year, but having not competed at all in the ATCC since he won the 1980 Oran Park event. The 1980s saw significant variety in the results, with seven different marques taking an event win. From 1985 to 1998 the circuit returned to the season-ending event on the calendar. One of the more controversial deciders in the circuit's history occurred in 1987 with championship combatants Jim Richards and Glenn Seton making contact as Richards took the lead and the championship victory. In 1989, long-time Holden driver Peter Brock won his first championship round aboard a Ford. 

At the 1992 event, Mark Skaife won both the Australian Touring Car Championship and the Australian Drivers' Championship in a Formula Brabham open-wheeler on the same day. Four-time series champion Jim Richards won his final solo round at the 1993 event. The 1995 championship decider saw John Bowe defeat Seton and Brock in a three-way battle for the title. In 1997, Brock farewelled the sport as a full-time driver at the event, winning the first race and only losing a likely round victory late in the third race when a puncture dropped him down the order. At the same event, Glenn Seton secured his second championship, ten years after his battle with Richards, in another three-way decider. The 1997 event was part of a seven-year streak of wins from the Holden Racing Team, each of the last four going to Skaife. In doing this, Skaife joined Moffat with a record six round wins at the circuit. 

The 2000 event was notable for a large start-line crash involving Larry Perkins, Paul Morris and Mark Larkham. Perkins stalled on the grid, and was hit by Morris who was then hit by Larkham, the latter two cars exploding into flames. All drivers escaped without serious injury. The 2005 event saw Russell Ingall win the only round of his championship-winning year. In 2007, Lee Holdsworth won his first championship race and round at the event in wet conditions. The 2008 event, branded under the Grand Finale umbrella, saw Jamie Whincup seal his first championship title, as well as Mark Skaife enter his final event as a full-time driver. It was also marred by an accident in the Australian Formula Ford Championship support category that saw Lucas Dumbrell left a quadriplegic. The event itself, won by Garth Tander, was the final championship event for the circuit, with Rick Kelly winning the final race at the circuit. Following the 2008 event the circuit was demolished for a housing redevelopment.

Winners

Multiple winners

By driver

By team

By manufacturer

Notes
  – Holden Dealer Team was known as Mobil 1 Racing from 1988 to 1990, hence their statistics are combined.

Event sponsors
 1981: Marlboro
 1982: ARCO
 1984–86: Castrol
 2007: Jim Beam
 2008: NRMA Motoring & Services

See also
 List of Australian Touring Car Championship races

References

Supercars Championship races